Sir Felix Edward Aylmer Jones, OBE (21 February 1889 – 2 September 1979) was an English stage actor who also appeared in the cinema and on television. Aylmer made appearances in films with comedians such as Will Hay and George Formby.

Early life
Felix Aylmer was born in Corsham, Wiltshire, the son of Lilian (Cookworthy) and Lieutenant-Colonel Thomas Edward Aylmer Jones. He was educated at King James's Grammar School, Almondbury, near Huddersfield, where he was a boarder from 1897 to 1900, Magdalen College School, and Exeter College, Oxford, where he was a member of Oxford University Dramatic Society (OUDS). He trained under the Victorian-era actress and director Rosina Filippi before securing his first professional engagement at the London Coliseum in 1911. He appeared in the world premiere of The Farmer's Wife by Eden Phillpotts at the Birmingham Repertory Theatre in 1917. Between 1917 and 1919 he served as a junior officer in the Royal Naval Volunteer Reserve (R.N.V.R.).

Career

He acted with Sir Laurence Olivier in Shakespearean films, appearing as Polonius in Hamlet (1948), and often played wise old men, such as Merlin in Knights of the Round Table (1953). He played the Archbishop of Canterbury in the film adaptation of Becket (1964), with Richard Burton and Peter O'Toole and gave elocution lessons to the young Audrey Hepburn.

His memorable style of delivery—dignified and learned— was frequently mimicked by comedians such as Peter Sellers and Kenneth Williams. Indeed, as dramatist and barrister John Mortimer noted, the mannerisms Aylmer brought to bear in his roles came to be imitated in real life by judges on the bench. Williams observed that although his impersonation of Aylmer was a speciality during his days with ENSA, the Armed Forces Entertainment Association, he came to the conclusion that none of the troops knew who was being impersonated.

Aylmer was President of Equity from 1950 to 1969. He was made an Officer of the Order of the British Empire in the 1950 King's Birthday Honours and knighted in the 1965 Queen's Birthday Honours.

He was also the narrator in the original version (and recobbled cut) of Richard Williams' unfinished  animated project, The Thief and the Cobbler.

At the age of 80 Felix Aylmer played a villain in an episode of Randall and Hopkirk (Deceased) entitled "It's Supposed to be Thicker than Water". His last major screen role was as the Abbot in the sitcom Oh, Brother!, opposite Derek Nimmo (1968–70). He appeared as a doctor in an episode of the TV series Jason King called "If It's Got To Go, It's Got To Go" in 1972, at the age of 83. 

Aylmer died in a nursing home in Pyrford, Surrey, in 1979, at the age of 90.

Personal life

He married Cecily Minnie Jane Byrne during the First World War, and they had three children.

Publications
 Dickens Incognito (1959)
 The Drood Case (1964)

Selected stage credits
 The Inca of Perusalem (1916)
 The Farmer's Wife (1917)
 The Likes of Her (1923)
 The Terror (1927)
 Badger's Green (1930)
 Spider's Web (1954)

Filmography

1930–1940

1941–1950

1951–1960

1961–1992

References

External links

 
  Performances in the theatre archive, University of Bristol
 

1889 births
1979 deaths
Alumni of Exeter College, Oxford
English male voice actors
English male film actors
English male stage actors
People from Corsham
English male Shakespearean actors
Knights Bachelor
Actors awarded knighthoods
Officers of the Order of the British Empire
People educated at King James's School, Almondbury
20th-century English male actors
Royal Navy officers of World War I
Royal Naval Volunteer Reserve personnel of World War I